Gabriele Mainetti (born 7 November 1976) is an Italian film director, actor, screenwriter, composer and producer.

Career
Mainetti started his career in the film industry as an actor for minor comedies and television series; as a director, he received attention thanks to his early short film Basette (2008), a tribute to anime series Lupin the Third. In 2012, he directed Tiger Boy, a teen drama short film about pedophilia that was awarded with a Silver Ribbon.

His debut feature film, They Call Me Jeeg (2015), was praised by audience and critic, gaining several major Italian prizes. Mainetti won the awards for Best New Director and Best Producer at the 2016 David di Donatello.

His second feature Freaks Out was scheduled to be released on 16 December 2020, but it was delayed to 28 October 2021 due to the COVID-19 pandemic in Italy.

Filmography

Feature films
They Call Me Jeeg (2015)
Freaks Out (2021)

Short films
Ultima spiaggia (2005)
Basette (2008)
Love in Central Park (2010)
Tiger Boy (2012)
Ningyo (2016)

References

External links
 
 

1976 births
Living people
Film people from Rome
Italian film directors
Italian film producers
Italian screenwriters
Male actors from Rome
Italian film score composers
Italian male film score composers